The Leather Patch is an 1886 comedic play by Edward Harrigan with songs by David Braham.  It debuted at Harrigan's Park Theatre in New York City on February 15, 1886, and ran through May.

Cast
Edward Harrigan as Jeremiah McCarthy
John Wild as Jefferson Putnam
Dan Callver as Caroline Hyer
M.J. Bradley as Airy McCafferty
James Fox as Linda Corncover
Harry Fisher as Judge Herman Doebler
A.C. Moreland as Counselor Delancey Wriggle
Richard Quilber as Jimmy the Kyd
Annie Yeamans as Madeline McCarthy
Amy Lee as Libby O'Dooley
Nella Wetherill as Mrs. O'Dooley
Annie Langdon as Nellie Conroy
Kate Langdon as Jennie Crimmons

Songs
None of the songs composed by Braham for the play turned out to be hits.

Baxter Avenue
Denny Grady's Hack
It Showered Again
Put on Your Bridal Veil

References

External links
 Sheet music from the play, at the Levy Sheet Music Collection
 1916 recording of "Harrigan--Hart--Braham melodies, no. 3", a medley which includes part of "Put on your bridal veil", at U.S. Library of Congress

American plays
1886 plays
Broadway plays